Diqing Shangri-La Airport  is an airport serving Shangri-La City, Dêqên Tibetan Autonomous Prefecture, Yunnan Province, China. The airport does not have any taxiways (other than the one leading to the terminal building), requiring planes landing there to backtaxi to the terminal building.

Airlines and destinations

See also
List of airports in China
List of highest airports

References

External links
Yunnan Airport Group - Reference

Airports in Yunnan
Shangri-La
Transport in Dêqên Tibetan Autonomous Prefecture